The Main road 403 is a short bypass direction First class main road near Nyíregyháza, that connects the Nyírgegyháza-kelet junction in M3 motorway to the Main road 4 near Nyírmada.

The road, as well as all other main roads in Hungary, is managed and maintained by Magyar Közút, a state owned company.

See also

 Roads in Hungary

Sources

External links
 Hungarian Public Road Non-Profit Ltd. (Magyar Közút Nonprofit Zrt.)
 National Infrastructure Developer Ltd.

Main roads in Hungary
Szabolcs-Szatmár-Bereg County